The dragon boundary marks are cast iron statues of dragons (sometimes mistaken for griffins) on metal or stone plinths that mark the boundaries of the City of London.  The dragons are painted silver, with details of their wings and tongue picked out in red.  The dragon stands on one rear leg, the other lifted against a shield, with the right foreleg raised and the left foreleg holding a shield which bears the City of London's coat of arms, painted in red and white. This stance is the equivalent of the rampant heraldic attitude of the supporters of the City's arms.

Design
The dragons were preserved when the Coal Exchange was demolished in 1962–63.

The Corporation of London's Streets Committee selected the statues as the model for boundary markers for the city in 1964, in preference to the fiercer dragon by C. B. Birch at Temple Bar on Fleet Street. Half-size replicas of the original pair of dragons were made by Birmingham Guild Limited and erected at main entrances to the City of London in the late 1960s.

Locations
There are now fourteen dragons around the City of London. In addition to the Birch dragon at Temple Bar, and the two original Coal Exchange statues on Victoria Embankment, there are two replicas of the Coal Exchange design at the south end of London Bridge, two on High Holborn near Gray's Inn Road, and single replicas on Aldgate High Street, Bishopsgate, Byward Street, Moorgate, Goswell Road (north of Aldersgate Street), Farringdon Street, and at the south end of Blackfriars Bridge.

Outside London, there is also a replica at Lake Havasu City, Arizona, where the 19th-century London Bridge was reconstructed in 1971.

Gallery

References

Sources

City of London
Outdoor sculptures in London
Buildings and structures in the City of London
Iron sculptures in the United Kingdom
1849 sculptures
Sculptures of dragons
Victoria Embankment
Cast-iron sculptures